Cavaleri is a station of line 1 of the Seville metro. It is located in the Jagüey Grande Square, in the municipality of Mairena del Aljarafe, Seville. Cavaleri is an underground type station, situated between Ciudad Expo and San Juan Alto on the same line. It was opened on April 2, 2009.

Connections

See also
 List of Seville metro stations

References

External links 
  Official site.
 History, construction details and maps.

Seville Metro stations
Railway stations in Spain opened in 2009